A duck pond is a pond for ducks and other waterfowl.

Duck pond may also refer to:

 Duck Pond (Judges Guild), a fantasy role-playing game.
 Ducky Pond (1902–1982), American football and baseball player
 Duck Pond Run, a river in New Jersey, United States
 Duck Pond mine, a closed Canadian mine
 Duck Ponds, South Australia
 Lara, Victoria, formerly known as "Duck Ponds"